The Best of Mountain is the only compilation album by American hard rock band Mountain. It consists of material recorded throughout 1970-1971, culled from their first three LPs. On 15 April 2003, the album was remastered and reissued in an expanded edition with new liner notes and four bonus tracks, two of which are taken from Leslie West's first solo album, 1969's Felix Pappalardi-produced Mountain, the project which eventually led to the formation of the band.

Track listing

Side 1 
"Never in My Life" (Leslie West, Felix Pappalardi, Gail Collins, Corky Laing) – 3:53
"Taunta (Sammy's Tune)" (Felix Pappalardi) – 1:00
"Nantucket Sleighride (to Owen Coffin)" (Felix Pappalardi, Gail Collins) – 5:55
"Roll Over Beethoven" (Chuck Berry) – 2:58
"For Yasgur's Farm" (George Gardos, Corky Laing, Felix Pappalardi, Gail Collins, Gary Ship, David Rae) – 3:23
"The Animal Trainer and the Toad" (Leslie West, Sue Palmer) – 3:29

Side 2 
"Mississippi Queen" (Leslie West, Corky Laing, Felix Pappalardi, David Rea) – 2:32
"King's Chorale" (Felix Pappalardi) – 1:04
"Boys in the Band" (Felix Pappalardi, Gail Collins) – 3:43
"Don't Look Around" (Leslie West, Sue Palmer, Felix Pappalardi, Gail Collins) – 3:47
"Theme for an Imaginary Western" (Jack Bruce, Pete Brown) – 5:07
"Crossroader" (Felix Pappalardi, Gail Collins) – 4:53

2003 Reissue Bonus Tracks 
"Long Red" (Leslie West, Felix Pappalardi, John Ventura, Norman Landsberg) – 3:17
"Dreams of Milk and Honey" (Leslie West, Felix Pappalardi, John Ventura, Norman Landsberg) – 3:36
"Silver Paper" (Leslie West, Felix Pappalardi, Gail Collins, George Gardos, Steve Knight, Corky Laing) – 3:19
"Travelin' in the Dark (to E.M.P.)" (Felix Pappalardi, Gail Collins) – 4:25

Personnel 

 Leslie West – guitar, vocals
 Felix Pappalardi – bass, vocals, production
 Steve Knight – keyboards
 Corky Laing – drums, percussion

Additional personnel
 Bud Prager – executive producer
 Bob d'Orleans – recording engineer
 Ed Lee – art direction
 Gail Collins – photography

Charts

Certifications

References

External links 
 Mountain - The Best of Mountain (1973) album review by Eduardo Rivadavia, credits & releases at AllMusic.com
 Mountain - The Best of Mountain (1973) album releases & credits at Discogs.com
 Mountain - The Best of Mountain (1973) album to be listened as stream at Play.Spotify.com

Mountain (band) albums
1973 greatest hits albums
Albums produced by Felix Pappalardi
Columbia Records compilation albums